German submarine U-374 was a Type VIIC U-boat of Nazi Germany's Kriegsmarine during World War II. She was ordered on 23 September 1939. Her keel was laid down by Howaldtswerke in Kiel on 18 December 1939, she was launched on 10 May 1941 and formally commissioned into the Kriegsmarine on 21 June 1941 under the command of Oberleutnant zur See Unno von Fischel.

U-374 had a short career, carrying out three patrols. During these she sank one merchant ship, the British Rose Schiaffino and two auxiliary warships, the naval trawler  and naval yacht HMY Rosabelle.

U-374 was sunk on 12 January 1942 in the western Mediterranean east of Cape Spartivento, in position , by torpedoes from the British submarine . 42 of her crew were killed; there was one survivor.

Design
German Type VIIC submarines were preceded by the shorter Type VIIB submarines. U-374 had a displacement of  when at the surface and  while submerged. She had two shafts and two  propellers.

U-374 was fitted with five  torpedo tubes (four fitted at the bow and one at the stern), fourteen torpedoes, one  SK C/35 naval gun, 220 rounds, and a  C/30 anti-aircraft gun. The boat had a complement of between forty-four and sixty.

Service history

First patrol
29 September 1941 (Kiel) – 11 November 1941 (Brest)

Second patrol
6 December 1941 (Brest) – 14 December 1941 (La Spezia)

Third patrol
18 December 1941 (La Spezia) – 12 January 1942 (sunk)

Wolfpacks
U-374 took part in one wolfpack, namely:
 Mordbrenner (16 October – 2 November 1941)

Summary of raiding history

References

Notes

Citations

Bibliography

External links

German Type VIIC submarines
U-boats commissioned in 1941
World War II submarines of Germany
1941 ships
World War II shipwrecks in the Mediterranean Sea
Ships built in Kiel
U-boats sunk in 1942
U-boats sunk by British submarines
Maritime incidents in January 1942